The following is the discography of the South Korean dance-pop boy group MBLAQ which consists of one studio album, eight extended plays (EPs), two compilation albums, and twenty-one singles. MBLAQ have been in the music business ever since making their live debut on Mnet's M! Countdown with their debut track, "Oh Yeah" on October 14, 2009.

Albums

Studio albums

Compilation albums

Extended plays

Singles

Other charted songs

Soundtrack appearances

Videography

Video albums

Music videos

Notes

References 

Discographies of South Korean artists
K-pop music group discographies